Incilius chompipe is a species of toads in the family Bufonidae, known from several localities near Cascajal in the Cerro Chompipe and in the Reserva Dantas, both in the Cordillera Central of Costa Rica.

Description
Males measure  and females, based on a single specimen,  in snout–vent length. The body is robust. The head bears canthal, supraorbital, supratympanic, and parietal crests, and the snout is acutely pointed. Parotoid glands are triangular and barely evident. Dorsal skin is, except for the nearly smooth mid-dorsum, roughened with numerous distinctly raised, rounded or pointed tubercles.

Skin secretions of Incilius chompipe can inflict notable irritation to human eyes.

Habitat and conservation
Its natural habitats are primary and mature cloud forests with a closed canopy at elevations of  asl. It seems to thrive in deep leaf litter.

It occurs on two protected areas.

References 

chompipe
Amphibians described in 2007
Amphibians of Costa Rica
Endemic fauna of Costa Rica